The boys' 100 metre freestyle event in swimming at the 2014 Summer Youth Olympics took place on 21–22 August at the Nanjing Olympic Sports Centre in Nanjing, China.

Results

Heats
The heats were held at 10:12.

Semifinals
The semifinals were held at 18:19.

Final
The final was held at 18:20.

References

Swimming at the 2014 Summer Youth Olympics